Illinois Times is a weekly free newspaper (distributed every Thursday) based in Springfield, Illinois. 

Founded in 1975, the newspaper was acquired in 1977 by Fletcher Farrar Sr., a Mount Vernon businessman who employed his son, Fletcher, Jr. (Bud), as editor. The senior Farrar died in 1995; his son sold the paper two years later. Farrar Jr. reacquired control in 2002 and returned as editor in 2008. The newspaper distributes about 28,000 copies at more than 400 locations in the Springfield, Illinois area.

References

External links

Springfield, Illinois
Newspapers published in Illinois
Alternative weekly newspapers published in the United States
Newspapers established in 1975
Companies based in Sangamon County, Illinois
1975 establishments in Illinois